Quicksand (Swedish: Störst av allt) is a novel by Malin Persson Giolito. It was originally published on 7 July, 2016 by Wahlström & Widstrand in Swedish. An English translation was published on 7 March, 2017 by Other Press.

Reception
The book received the 2016 Best Swedish Crime Novel Award and the 2017 Glass Key award. Kirkus Reviews said that "Giolito gives us the unsettling monologue of a teenage girl as she works her way through her role in murder. It is a splendid work of fiction."

Adaptation
In September 2017, it was announced that Netflix had ordered an adaption of the novel to be developed into an eponymous series, Quicksand, and would partner with FLX to produce the series. The series premiered on April 5, 2019.

References

2016 Swedish novels
Swedish novels adapted into television shows
Swedish crime novels
Other Press books